Peru Township is located in LaSalle County, Illinois. As of the 2010 census, its population was 10,732 and it contained 4,971 housing units. Peru Township was originally named Salisbury Township, but was changed on September 27, 1856.

Geography

Demographics

References

External links
US Census
City-data.com
Illinois State Archives

Townships in LaSalle County, Illinois
Populated places established in 1856
Townships in Illinois
1856 establishments in Illinois